Solovki may refer to one of the following places in  Russia:

Solovetsky Islands
Solovki Airport, the airport serving the Solovetsky Islands
Solovetsky Monastery on the islands
Solovki prison camp, formerly on the islands